"Cholo Bodle Jai" is a song by the Bangladeshi rock band LRB, released in mid-1993. It was both written and composed by Ayub Bachchu, for the band's third studio album "সুখ (Happiness)". It is often referred to as one of the greatest bangla rock songs.

The song begins with an acoustic guitar and drum. The first verse starts in ten seconds after the intro. The electronic instruments part starts in the chorus line and ends before the second verse. Unlike the other LRB songs, this song has a more mellow and small guitar solo.

The unplugged version was featured in the live album Ferari Mon: Unplugged Live in 1996, and features violin performed by Sunil Chandra Das. "চলো বদলে যাই (Let's Change)" is one of the most popular songs in Bangladesh and one of the best-known song by LRB. The song featured regularly in concerts. Till date, the song has been viewed over 26 million times, and is the most viewed rock song in Bangladesh.

Writing

The recording took place in Audio Art Studio located in Nawabpur Road in Old Dhaka. Bachchu said in an interview with Prothom Alo in January 2016 that:

Legacy

"চলো বদলে যায় (Let's Change)" is considered to be one of the greatest rock song and also one of the most popular rock song in Bangladesh. Maqsoodul Hoque of Feedback said in Airtel presents "A Tribute to Ayub Bachchu" in November 2018:

Indian brand consultant Roopsha Ray Dasgupta said about the song:

Controversy

On July 5, 2018, a flute player named Rakibul Islam covered the song in flute and uploaded it on YouTube, which had received well views from fans. Bachchu stated that:

In 2018, a Pakistani company, named Cross Stitch had copied the tune of the song as their background music, without the permission of LRB. For this, the Pakistani company was criticised in Bangladesh. Bachchu told Prothom Alo that:

References

External links
 LRB - "চলো দলে যাই (Let's Change)" on YouTube
 LRB - "চলো দলে যাই (Let's Change)" on Amazon Music

Bengali-language songs
1993 songs
Rock songs
Ayub Bachchu songs
Bangladeshi songs